Boka is a waterfall in the western part of Slovenia, near the Soča River.

Overview 
The waterfall is supplied by a karst spring under an almost vertical limestone wall. Because of its karst nature, the spring has a relatively large discharge due to its underground drainage in the mountains of Kanin.

Access 
The waterfall is visible from this road, especially its upper part. Next to the road and Boka Creek, there is a parking lot, and a gravel road leads uphill towards the waterfall.

References

External links 

 Boka at Slapovi Slovenije

Waterfalls of Slovenia